Bedford station was an intercity rail station located in Bedford, Virginia. It was served by Norfolk and Western Railway passenger trains until 1971. It was later served by Amtrak's Mountaineer from 1975 to 1977, then the Hilltopper until 1979. The station building remains extant and is used as a restaurant.

History
The Virginia and Tennessee Railroad was built through Bedford in 1857; stations at Bedford were served for over a century. Even as local service petered out in the 1960s, the Norfolk and Western Railway (N&W) continued to run the crack Norfolk–Cincinnati Pocahontas and the local station counterpart on the same route, the Powhatan Arrow.  The N&W also operated the Birmingham–Washington Birmingham Special (unnamed after February 1970 and cut back to Bristol in August 1970), the New Orleans-Washington Pelican (discontinued, 1970) and the Memphis-bound Tennessean. When Amtrak took over intercity passenger rail service on May 1, 1971, it chose not to continue service on these trains, thus ending service to Bedford.

Amtrak service
Service was restored on March 24, 1975, with the introduction of the Mountaineer service between Norfolk and Chicago. The Mountaineer was replaced by the Hilltopper on June 1, 1977. The Hilltopper was discontinued on October 1, 1979, ending rail service to Bedford for the second time. The station building was later repurposed as a restaurant.

Proposed new service
Amtrak's Northeast Regional service was extended to Roanoke station on October 31, 2017. The town of Bedford requested an intermediate station stop, but this was denied because of low projected ridership. However, in 2016, the town hired a consultant to further study the potential for a station.

References

External links 

Citizens For a Bedford Train Station
Liberty Station Restaurant
TrainWeb USA Rail Guide – Bedford

Transportation in Bedford County, Virginia
Buildings and structures in Bedford County, Virginia
Former Amtrak stations in Virginia
Norfolk and Western Railway stations
Railway stations in the United States opened in 1975
Railway stations closed in 1971
Railway stations closed in 1979
Repurposed railway stations in the United States